Joan of Rethel (died 1328) was Countess of Rethel between 1285 and 1328.

She was the daughter of Hugh IV, Count of Rethel and his third wife Isabelle of Grandpré. She succeeded her father as Countess of Rethel in 1285. Joan married in 1290 with Louis I, Count of Nevers, son of Robert III, Count of Flanders. 

They had two children: 
 Joan (1295–1375), married John of Montfort
 Louis (1304–1346), Count of Flanders, Nevers and Rethel

Counts of Rethel
French countesses
House of Dampierre
1328 deaths
Year of birth unknown
13th-century women rulers